The 2016–17 Loyola Marymount Lions women's basketball team represented Loyola Marymount University in the 2016–17 NCAA Division I women's basketball season. The Lions, led by fifth year head coach Charity Elliott, played their homes games at the Gersten Pavilion and were members of the West Coast Conference. They finished the season 14–16, 9–9 in WCC play to finish in a tie for fifth place. They lost in the quarterfinals of the WCC women's tournament to San Francisco.

Roster

Schedule

|-
!colspan=12 style="background:#8E0028; color:#00345B;"| Exhibition

|-
!colspan=12 style="background:#8E0028; color:#00345B;"| Non-conference regular season

|-
!colspan=12 style="background:#8E0028; color:#00345B;"| WCC regular season

|-
!colspan=12 style="background:#8E0028;"| WCC Women's Tournament

See also
 2016–17 Loyola Marymount Lions men's basketball team

References

Loyola Marymount Lions women's basketball seasons
Loyola Marymount
Loyola Marymount
Loyola Marymount
Loyola Marymount
Loyola Marymount